Fried Green Tomatoes is the ninth and final studio album by country music artist Ricky Van Shelton. Of the two singles released, "The Decision" charted at number 71 while "Call Me Crazy" failed to chart. This was his only release for the Audium label. "All I Have to Offer You Is Me" is a cover of a Charley Pride single. "I'm the One" was previously recorded by McBride & the Ride on their 1992 album Sacred Ground, which also includes a cover of "All I Have to Offer You Is Me".

Track listing
"Call Me Crazy" (Brett Jones, Wendell Mobley) - 3:19
"Foolish Pride" (Ernie Rowell, Mel Tillis, Jr.) - 3:37
"I'm the One" (Terry McBride, Gary Nicholson) - 3:54
"Somebody's Gonna Lose" (Larry Butler, Mark Sherrill) - 3:50
"I Think I Like It Here" (Tom Shapiro, Chris Waters, Jimmy Yeary) - 3:18
"You Go Your Way (And I'll Go Crazy)" (Joe Chambers, Bucky Jones) - 3:41
"Who's Laughin' Now" (Tom Littlefield, Rick Rowell, Mel Tillis Jr.) - 3:00
"All I Have to Offer You Is Me" (Dallas Frazier, A.L. "Doodle" Owens) - 3:21
"From the Fryin' Pan" (Monty Criswell, Sam Gay) - 3:08
"I Was Losing You" (Bruce Burch) - 3:21
"Your One and Only" (Hillary Kanter, Even Stevens) - 2:59
"The Decision" (Jerry Thompson, Ricky Van Shelton) - 4:46

Personnel
From Fried Green Tomatoes liner notes.
Musicians
Pat Coil - keyboards
Larry Franklin - fiddle, mandolin, acoustic guitar
Shannon Forrest - drums
Steve Gibson - acoustic guitar, electric guitar, background vocals
Wes Hightower - background vocals
John Hobbs - piano, keyboards
B. James Lowry - acoustic guitar
Liana Manis - background vocals
Brent Mason - electric guitar
Terry McMillan - harmonica
Larry Paxton - bass guitar
John Wesley Ryles - background vocals

Technical
Steve Gibson - production, engineering
Alan Schulman - engineering, mixing
Ricky Van Shelton - production ("The Decision" only)
Steve Tvweit - engineering

References

2000 albums
Ricky Van Shelton albums
E1 Music albums